Dia Psalma was a self-described punk/folk rock/metal fusion band, from Strängnäs, Sweden.  It was formed by former members of Strebers that started in 1985 (and played as Sixguns for  a while).

Dia Psalma was formed shortly after Johnny, drummer and main lyrics writer in Strebers was killed in a car crash.  After his death in 1992 Ulke (guitar and vocals) and Ztikkan (bass) recorded a final Strebers album called Till En Vän (To A Friend) with Solbjörn (a drum machine).  The same year the band went on tour with Stipen as drummer after Solbjörn (according to legend) got a new job as a jazz musician in the USA.  After the tour they decided to create the band Dia Psalma. Before disappearing in 1997 they released three albums and seven singles.

On January 17, 2006, it was stated that Dia Psalma would be reunited.  They released a compilation CD, with all their earlier songs on, called "Psamlade Psalmer" ((p)Collected Hymns). In the fall of 2007 they released a new studio album called "Djupa Skogen" (Deep Forest), and a tour of Sweden followed. In late December, 2007, the band announced that they had started to write songs for a new album. In March 2011 the band wrote on their webpage that they would dissolve the band at the end of the year after another tour of Sweden where they played Gryningstid live in its entirety a final time. Despite this the band made another appearance, playing just a few songs, at the 30 year celebration of their label Birdnest Records in May 2012.

Discography

Studio albums

Singles

Compilation albums
 Sell Out (1996)
 Psamlade Psalmer ("(P)collected Hymns") (2006)

References

External links 

 
 
 Den artificiella hemsidan

Swedish punk rock groups